Xerocrassa franciscoi is a species of air-breathing land snail, a pulmonate gastropod mollusk in the family Geomitridae.

Distribution

This species is endemic to Greece, where it is restricted to the southern slope of the western Asterousia Mountains, south of Kapetaniana, in central Crete.

See also
List of non-marine molluscs of Greece

References

 Bank, R. A.; Neubert, E. (2017). Checklist of the land and freshwater Gastropoda of Europe. Last update: July 16th, 2017

Further reading

franciscoi
Molluscs of Europe
Endemic fauna of Crete
Gastropods described in 2009